The Greene Shoots Theatre is an amateur theatre company formed in 2002. Greene Shoots Theatre  specialise in performing classic texts and adapting them for large ensemble casts. The company's acting style often uses physical theatre, mime and chorus work.

A number of productions have been performed at the Edinburgh Festival Fringe including Bertolt Brecht's The Resistible Rise of Arturo Ui, at The Garage Theatre in 2003, Nikolai Gogol's The Government Inspector adapted by Steph Gunary  at C Venues  on Chambers Street in 2006 and a new adaptation of Molière's Tartuffe   by Rob Messik in 2008. In 2010, the company performed a new adaptation of Goldoni's The Venetian Twins and in 2014, an adaption of Jarry's King Ubu both by Steph Gunary. In August 2016, their latest venture, a new adaptation of Molière's The Hypochondriac by Oliver Pengelly and Dawn Wylie was performed at C Venues at the Edinburgh Festival Fringe by a cast of 19.

Reviews 
The Resistible Rise of Arturo Ui 2002 Counter Culture Magazine
The Resistible Rise of Arturo Ui 2003 (Three Weeks)
The Government Inspector 2006 Counter Culture Magazine
The Government Inspector 2006 Three Weeks
Tartuffe 2008 ThreeWeeks Review
The Venetian Twins 2010 Edinburgh Spotlight
The Venetian Twins 2010 The New Current
The Venetian Twins 2010 Broadway Baby
The Venetian Twins 2010 ThreeWeeks

References

External links 
Greene Shoots Theatre Official Website 
C Venues Official Website
The Edinburgh Festival Fringe Official Website

Amateur theatre companies in England
Culture in Hertfordshire